Corosolic acid is a pentacyclic triterpene acid found in Lagerstroemia speciosa. It is similar in structure to ursolic acid, differing only in the fact that it has a 2-alpha-hydroxy attachment.

References

Triterpenes
Organic acids